Russia competed as the host nation at the 2015 World Aquatics Championships in Kazan from 24 July to 9 August 2015.

Medalists

Diving

Russian divers qualified for the individual spots and the synchronized teams at the Worlds through the National Championships.

Men

Women

Mixed

High diving

Russia has qualified one high diver at the World Championships.

Open water swimming

Russia fielded a full team of eight swimmers to compete in the open water marathon.

Men

Women

Mixed

Swimming

Russian swimmers have achieved qualifying standards in the following events (up to a maximum of 2 swimmers in each event at the A-standard entry time, and 1 at the B-standard): Swimmers must qualify at the 2015 Russian Championships in Moscow (for pool events) to confirm their places for the Worlds.

The Russian team consists of 37 swimmers (22 men and 15 women). Among the official roster featured sprint freestyle sensation Vladimir Morozov, 2012 Olympic silver medalist Anastasia Zuyeva, and two-time defending World champion Yuliya Yefimova.

Men

Women

Mixed

Synchronized swimming

Russia sent a full squad of twelve synchronized swimmers (one male and eleven female), including 2012 Olympic champions Natalia Ishchenko and Svetlana Romashina, to compete in each of the following events.

Women

Mixed

Water polo

Men's tournament

Team roster

Anton Antonov
Alexey Bugaychuk
Artem Odintsov
Igor Bychkov
Albert Zinnatullin
Artem Ashaev
Vladislav Timakov
Ivan Nagaev
Konstantin Stepaniuk
Dmitrii Kholod
Sergey Lisunov
Lev Magomaev
Victor Ivanov

Group play

13th–16th place semifinals

13th place game

Women's tournament

Team roster

Anastasia Verkhoglyadova
Tatiana Zubkova
Ekaterina Prokofyeva
Elvina Karimova
Ekaterina Zubacheva
Anastasia Simanovich
Ekaterina Lisunova
Evgeniia Abdriziakova
Anna Timofeeva
Ekaterina Tankeeva
Evgeniya Ivanova
Nadezhda Iarondaikina
Anna Karnaukh

Group play

Quarterfinals

5th–8th place semifinals

Seventh place game

References

External links
 

Nations at the 2015 World Aquatics Championships
2015 in Russian sport
Russia at the World Aquatics Championships